Alast-e Olya (also Romanized as Alast-e ‘Olyā; also known as Alast-e Bālā, Alast Bālā, ‘Alās, and Alast) is a village in Safiabad Rural District, Bam and Safiabad District, Esfarayen County, North Khorasan Province, Iran. At the 2006 census, its population was 673, in 148 families.

References 

Populated places in Esfarayen County